Aurelio González (born 16 January 1939) is an Argentine boxer. He competed in the men's welterweight event at the 1960 Summer Olympics.

References

1939 births
Living people
Argentine male boxers
Olympic boxers of Argentina
Boxers at the 1960 Summer Olympics
Boxers at the 1959 Pan American Games
Pan American Games silver medalists for Argentina
Pan American Games medalists in boxing
Boxers from Buenos Aires
Welterweight boxers
Medalists at the 1959 Pan American Games